The International Rutabaga Curling Championship takes place annually at the Ithaca Farmers' Market, New York state, on the last day of the market season, which is typically the third weekend in December.

History 
The International Rutabaga Curling Championship started spontaneously in December 1997. Vendors at the Ithaca Farmers' Market began rolling their wares down the main aisle with the intent to stay warm; vendors did not discriminate about what they threw, and even frozen chickens were utilized.  Rules have since been developed by Steve Sierigk, the High Commissioner of the International Rutabaga Curling Championship.

Because the Ithaca Farmers' Market is a food sales operation and thus classified as an essential business, it was allowed to hold the championship in 2020, one of the few events to be held in-person during the COVID-19 pandemic in New York State. Contestants that year were limited to market vendors, with in-person spectating also severely limited.

Rules 
 The court is drawn within the confines of the market midway, composed of roughly flat, wooden planks. The pitch is generally around 79 feet with a circular target at the far end (see curling for a graphical representation of a similar target). Once a rutabaga has been thrown it shall lie on the field of play until all other contestants in that section have rolled. Thrown rutabagas are subject to being knocked by subsequent rolls.
 Contestants are divided into three sections, each competing within themselves. The top three finishers of each section qualify for the championship round. The top three contestants in that round are awarded gold, silver, and bronze medals, along with eternal glory, honor, and fame.
 Only rutabagas are allowed to be used in the competition. Turnips, any other variety of root vegetable, or member of the Cruciferae family will not be permitted. (An exception was made in the 2005 championships to allow the use of turnips. The emergency rule change was necessary because the official rutabagas were frozen and unavailable for use.) Contestants are encouraged to supply their own rutabagas, though vendors may be on hand to provide suitable rutabagas for competition. Modification of the rutabaga is acceptable so long as the rutabaga is always able to roll on every axis.

Winners 

 In 2002, 8-year-old David Tregaskis took the gold. Tregaskis was also noted as the youngest competitor in 2003.
 In 2004, Eric Nicholson bested the competition for gold at age 10.
 In 2005, team Curlicious, composed of students from Cornell University, sported two of the top three finishers. Kevin Waskelis and Rena Grossman, both of Curlicious, took gold and silver respectively.
In 2008, the #41 rutabaga collided with a wooden barrier and split into two pieces.  On inspection, the rutabaga was found to be rotten in the middle.  In a controversial decision, the crowd voted to award contestant #41 a replacement rutabaga and another throw.  That rutabaga was awarded to Tom Mansell, who went on to win first place in the 2008 competition.
 To date, no champion has ever successfully defended his or her title, though three contestants have medaled twice. In 2008 Ray Schlather became the first curler to medal twice, taking the silver again after a similar performance in 2006. In 2011, Steve Paisley, who took second place in 2009, returned with his vintage, frozen rutabaga to take the gold medal at the Curl. Michael Gloss won third place in both 2011 and 2016.
In 2020, the Rutabaga Curl went viral. Only market vendors were allowed to curl at the in-person event. Non-vendor participants curled their rutabagas at home and were encouraged to send video evidence as proof of their efforts.

Notes

External links 
 International Rutabaga Curling Championship Official Page
 Advanced Rutabaga Studies Institute

Images
 David Makar, 2005
 Jon Gunderlach, 2005

Sports competitions in New York (state)
Recurring sporting events established in 1997
1997 establishments in New York (state)